The term switchboard, when used by itself, may refer to:

Telephone switchboard
 Electrical controls:
Electric switchboard in industrial applications like electricity generation
Distribution board in residential and commercial applications
Printed circuit board
Mixing console
Switchboard, another term a helpline.
Switchboard of Miami, a nonprofit organization offering hotline, informational and referral services in Miami, Florida
Switchboard (UK), formerly known as the London Lesbian and Gay Switchboard, a helpline for the LGBT+ persons in the UK